Steal the Light is the sixth studio album of Melbourne band The Cat Empire. It was released on 17 May 2013, through Inertia Records and Two Shoes Records. Lead single "Brighter Than Gold" was released on 22 February 2013 to commercial success, placing at number 89 in the Triple J Hottest 100, 2013. Another single, "Steal the Light", was released on 9 May 2013. The cover art of the album is the work of Graeme Base, a longtime fan of the band, who convinced the band to lift their 12-year ban on cat references in album art.

Track listing

Personnel 

The Cat Empire core members
 Harry James Angus – vocals, trumpet
 Will Hull-Brown – drums, percussion
 Jamshid Khadiwhala – turntables, percussion
 Ollie McGill – piano, organ, backing vocals
 Ryan Monro – bass guitar
 Felix Riebl – lead vocals, percussion

The Empire Horns (auxiliary members)
 Kieran Conrau – trombone, backing vocals
 Ross Irwin – trumpet, backing vocals
Additional musicians
 Rose Paez – backing vocals (tracks 4, 7)
 Al Burkoy – violin (tracks 4, 8)
 Luis Poblete – backing vocals (track 8), bongos (track 8), bell (track 8)

Recording details
 Produced by – Jan Skubiszewski
 Mixing – Jan Skubiszewski
 Engineering – Jan Skubiszewski
 Assistant engineering – Michael O'Connell
 Mastered by – Geoff Pesche
 Studio – Way of the Eagle Studios (engineering, mixing); Abbey Road (mastering)

Charts

External links
 The Cat Empire Home Page

References

2013 albums
The Cat Empire albums